Cumberland County is a county in the Canadian province of Nova Scotia.

History
The name Cumberland was applied by Lieutenant-Colonel Robert Monckton to the captured Fort Beauséjour on June 18, 1755 in honour of the third son of King George II, William Augustus, Duke of Cumberland, victor at Culloden in 1746 and Commander in Chief of the British forces. The Mi'kmaq name for the area was "Kwesomalegek" meaning "hardwood point".

Cumberland County was founded on August 17, 1759. When the Township of Parrsboro was divided in 1840, one part was annexed to Cumberland County and the other part annexed to Colchester.

The dividing line between Cumberland and Colchester was established in 1840. In 1897, a portion of the boundary line between the Counties of Colchester and Cumberland was fixed and defined. The county thrived in the 19th century with the development of lumbering, shipbuilding and coal mining. Deforestation and rural outmigration in the 20th century led to the abandonment of some communities such as Eatonville and New Yarmouth.

Geography

Cumberland County is rich in natural resources with extensive forest land supporting lumber mills and pulp contractors.  It has many mineral resources, including 2 operating salt mines.  Until the 1970s it also had several coal mines which extracted coal from seams that run from Joggins to River Hebert and on to Athol and Springhill.

Agriculture is concentrated on wild blueberry harvesting throughout the Cobequid Hills, as well as mixed farms located in the Tantramar Marshes region, the Northumberland Strait coastal plain, and the Wentworth Valley.

The northwestern edge of Cumberland County forms part of the Isthmus of Chignecto, the natural land bridge connecting the Nova Scotia peninsula to North America.  As such, the county hosts several important transportation corridors, including Highway 104 (the Trans-Canada Highway) and CN Rail's Halifax-Montreal railway line.

Two towns are located in Cumberland County: Amherst and Oxford.

Demographics 

Population trend

Mother tongue language (2011)

Ethnic Groups (2006)

Communities

Towns
Amherst
Oxford

Villages
Pugwash
River Hebert

County municipality and county subdivisions
Municipality of the County of Cumberland
Cumberland Subdivision A
Cumberland Subdivision B
Cumberland Subdivision C
Cumberland Subdivision D

Highways

See also
 List of municipalities in Nova Scotia
 Central Nova Tourist Association — Tourism Association Representing Cumberland County.
 Royal eponyms in Canada
 Black Lake listings within Nova Scotia.

References

External links

Cumberland County official site
 Photographs of the Cumberland County War Memorial monument, Amherst
Photographs of historic monuments in Cumberland County

 
County municipalities in Nova Scotia
1759 establishments in Nova Scotia